The 2005 Australian Performance Car Championship was a CAMS sanctioned motor racing championship, organised by GT Performance Racing Pty Ltd. It was the first championship to be contested under the Australian Performance Car Championship name with similar titles having been run in the two previous years as the Australian GT Performance Car Championship.

Peter Floyd won the series by 39 points driving a HSV GTS. It was the first time a driver of a HSV had won the series. Garry Holt finished second in the championship with 2003 champion Mark King in third.

Calendar
The championship was contested over a seven round series with three races per round.
 Round 1, Adelaide Parklands Circuit, South Australia, 17-20 March 
 Round 2, Wakefield Park Raceway, New South Wales, 13-15 May
 Round 3, Eastern Creek International Raceway, New South Wales, 27-29 May
 Round 4, Hidden Valley Raceway, Northern Territory, 1-3 July
 Round 5, Oran Park Motorsport Circuit, New South Wales, 12-14 August
 Round 6, Symmons Plains International Raceway, Tasmania, 11-13 November
 Round 7, Phillip Island Grand Prix Circuit, Victoria, 25-27 November

Points system
Points were awarded on a 30-24-20-18-17-16-15-14-13-12-11-10-9-8-7-6-5-4-3-2-1 basis to the first 21 classified finishers in each race. An additional 3 points were awarded to the driver setting the fastest qualifying time at each round.

Results

References

External links
 Image of the HSV GTS of championship winner Peter Floyd

Australian Performance Car Championship
Per